Joseph-Eugène Rhéault (March 7, 1856 – April 5, 1921) was a Canadian provincial politician. He was the Liberal member of the Legislative Assembly of Quebec for Wolfe from 1919 until his death in 1921. He was also mayor of Disraëli from 1905 to 1910.

References

1856 births
1921 deaths
Mayors of places in Quebec
People from Centre-du-Québec
Quebec Liberal Party MNAs